Arabic Sciences and Philosophy, subtitled A Historical Journal, is a peer-reviewed academic journal published by Cambridge University Press. The journal deals with the history of Arabic science, mathematics and philosophy between the 8th and the 18th centuries in a cross-cultural context. It publishes original papers on the history of these disciplines as well as studies of the relations between Arabic sciences and philosophy, with Greek, Indian, Chinese, Latin, Byzantine, Syriac, and Hebrew sciences and philosophy. The journal was established in 1991 and is published twice a year.

Abstracting and indexing 
The journal is abstracted and indexed by International Bibliography of Periodical Literature, International Bibliography of Book Reviews of Scholarly Literature, and Scopus.

External links
 

History of science journals
History of philosophy journals
Arab culture
Publications established in 1991
Cambridge University Press academic journals
Multilingual journals
Biannual journals
1991 establishments in the United Kingdom